Oddbins is an off-licence retail chain in the United Kingdom, established in 1963 by Ahmed Pochee.

The chain currently operates 46 branches with 30 in London, 9 in Scotland and across the rest of the UK, under the leadership of managing director Ayo Akintola. It also operates a trade arm, Oddbins Wholesale, which supplies restaurants, pubs, bars and other businesses throughout the UK.

History
In 1963, entrepreneur Ahmed Pochee established a small business delivering "bin-ends" and "oddments" of wine to restaurants and clubs in London's West End. Ten years later the company was purchased by Nick Baile and Dennis Ing, but it wasn't until the early 1980s that the company's distinct style was discovered. Illustrator Ralph Steadman was asked by Gordon Kerr, the marketing director at that time, to produce ten drawings similar in style to his illustrations for Fear and Loathing in Las Vegas. Steadman continued working for Oddbins for the next 12 years.

Due to the levels of debt within the business in the late 1980s, Oddbins was acquired by Seagram, a distribution company based in the United States. During this period, Oddbins was largely permitted to develop with autonomy, albeit with incentive to strongly promote the Seagram brands.

The company grew from 100 to 278 locations and came to be regarded as a favourite of a generation of wine drinkers. It was during this period that Patsy Stone (the fictional character portrayed by Joanna Lumley in Absolutely Fabulous) lived in the storeroom of an Oddbins off licence in London.

French Groupe Castel, who also owned the Nicolas chain from 2002-2008, purchased the company. It was then bought by Simon Baile, son of Nick Baile. Oddbins operated 158 stores in the United Kingdom, including 20 in the capital, 4 in Ireland and 1 in Calais, France.

In 2010 the company launched a new off-licence and convenience store concept called "Oddies."

In early 2011 Oddbins closed a third of its branches, reducing the number remaining open to under 100, leading to a proposal to enter a company voluntary arrangement (CVA). In April 2011, Oddbins went into administration, following the breakdown of talks over the CVA after objections from HMRC, which is owed nearly half of the chains' total debt of £20 million. On 26 April, Whittalls Wine Merchants, part of Raj Chatha's European Food Brokers (EFB) group, bought 37 of the shops from the administrators in a move that saved 200 jobs. and acquired the exclusive rights to the name. The remaining 48 shops were closed by the administrators.

In mid-2011 Oddbins radically changed their pricing strategy to move away from deep case discounts to offer customers a better price on individual bottles. In addition, head of buying Ana Sapungiu MW overhauled their range. She had an innovative approach to buying, looking to explore the less familiar categories whilst challenging the classic regions for value and point of interest for the engaged Oddbins customer.

On 19 October 2011 the new owners officially relaunched Oddbins. On 1 February 2019, Oddbins again went into administration.

See also 
 Majestic Wine
 First Quench Retailing

References

External links 
 

British companies established in 1963
Retail companies established in 1963
Wine retailers of the United Kingdom
1963 establishments in England
Companies that have entered administration in the United Kingdom